Xylophanes pearsoni is a moth of the  family Sphingidae. It is known from eastern Brazil.

The length of the forewings is about 35 mm for males and about 36 mm for females. It is similar to Xylophanes libya, except for some differences in the pattern of the forewing and hindwing upperside. Females are similar to males but have broader and rounder forewings and a pattern which is more contrasting.

The larvae probably feed on Rubiaceae and Malvaceae species.

References

pearsoni
Moths described in 2002
Endemic fauna of Brazil
Moths of South America